Lioglyphostoma is a genus of sea snails, marine gastropod mollusks in the family Pseudomelatomidae.

Species
Species within the genus Lioglyphostoma include:
 Lioglyphostoma acrocarinatum (Dall, 1927)
 Lioglyphostoma adematum Woodring, 1928
 Lioglyphostoma aguadillanum (Dall & Simpson, 1901)
 Lioglyphostoma antillarum (d'Orbigny, 1842)
 † Lioglyphostoma chinenensis MacNeil, 1960 
 Lioglyphostoma crebriforma Shasky & Campbell, 1964
 Lioglyphostoma ericea (Hinds, 1843)
 Lioglyphostoma hendersoni (Bartsch, 1934)
 Lioglyphostoma jousseaumei (Dautzenberg, 1900)
 † Lioglyphostoma moinica (Olsson, 1922) 
 Lioglyphostoma oenoa (Bartsch, 1934)
 Lioglyphostoma rectilabrum McLean & Poorman, 1971
 † Lioglyphostoma rusum Gardner, 1937
 † Lioglyphostoma tenuata MacNeil, 1960   
 † Lioglyphostoma tyro Gardner, 1937 
 Lioglyphostoma woodringi Fargo, 1953
Species brought into synonymy
 Lioglyphostoma acapulcanum Pilsbry & Lowe, 1932: synonym of Miraclathurella bicanalifera (G.B. Sowerby I, 1834)	
 Lioglyphostoma armstrongi J. G. Hertlein & A. M. Strong, 1955: synonym of Glyphostoma neglecta (Hinds, R.B., 1843)
 Lioglyphostoma canna (Dall, 1889): synonym of Compsodrillia canna (Dall, 1889)
 Lioglyphostoma rioensis (E.A. Smith, 1915): synonym of Brachytoma rioensis (E. A. Smith, 1915)
 Lioglyphostoma sirena Dall, 1919: synonym of Lioglyphostoma ericea (Hinds, 1843)

References

 W. P. Woodring. 1928. Miocene Molluscs from Bowden, Jamaica. Part 2: Gastropods and discussion of results. Contributions to the Geology and Palaeontology of the West Indies

External links
 
 Bouchet, P.; Kantor, Y. I.; Sysoev, A.; Puillandre, N. (2011). A new operational classification of the Conoidea (Gastropoda). Journal of Molluscan Studies. 77(3): 273-308
 Worldwide Mollusc Species Data Base: Pseudomelatomidae

 
Pseudomelatomidae